El Malpais National Monument is a National Monument located in western New Mexico, in the Southwestern United States. The name El Malpais is from the Spanish term Malpaís, meaning badlands, due to the extremely barren and dramatic volcanic field that covers much of the park's area.

It is on the Trails of the Ancients Byway, one of the designated New Mexico Scenic Byways.

Geography and geology

The lava flows, cinder cones, and other volcanic features of El Malpais are part of the Zuni-Bandera volcanic field, the second largest volcanic field in the Basin and Range Province. This volcanically active area on the southeast margin of the Colorado Plateau is located on the ancient Jemez Lineament, which provides the crustal weakness that recent magmatic intrusions and Cenozoic volcanism are attributed to.

The rugged pahoēhoē and ʻaʻā lava flows of the Zuni-Bandera eruptions (also called the Grants Lava Flows) filled a large basin, created by normal faulting associated with the Rio Grande Rift, between the high mesas of the Acoma Pueblo to the east, Mt. Taylor to the north, and the Zuni Mountain anticline to the northwest. Vents associated with these flows include Bandera Crater, El Calderon, and several other cinder cones; more than a dozen older cinder cones follow a roughly north-south distribution along the Chain of Craters west of the monument.

Features

El Malpais has many lava tubes open to explore (unguided) with a free caving permit, available at NPS-staffed facilities. There are currently four caves accessible by permit: Junction and Xenolith caves in the El Caldron area, and Big Skylight and Giant Ice caves in the Big Tubes area. From December 2010 to June 2013, all caves were temporarily closed to recreational use to protect bats from the spread of White Nose Syndrome (WNS) until a permitting process, including visitor screening for WNS, could be implemented.

A nearby scenic overlook at Sandstone Bluffs offers spectacular panoramic views over the monument's lava flows.

Natural history
Some of the oldest Rocky Mountain Douglas-firs (Pseudotsuga menziesii subsp. glauca) on Earth can be found living in El Malpais Monument. In 2020, a new population of hart's-tongue ferns (Asplenium scolopendrium) was discovered inside of a cave with basaltic lava flows in El Malpais, which represents the first confirmed population of the species in the United States or Canada west of the Mississippi; all other known populations of the fern are around the Great Lakes, Alabama, and Tennessee. Genetic analyses and surveys are currently being performed to determine the population's variation and overall health.

History
 
The area around El Malpais was used for resources, settlement, and travel by Oasisamerica cultures, Native Americans, and Spanish colonial and pioneer exploration. Archaeological sites remain in the park.
 
In the 1940s the Malpais lava field was one of the eight candidate sites considered by the Manhattan Project to test detonate the first atomic bomb, the Trinity nuclear test, which did occur to the south at White Sands Proving Ground. The Department of Defense did use the site as a bombing range to train pilots during World War II.

After the war, the Bureau of Land Management became the administrator of the area. In 1987, President Reagan signed  that created El Malpais National Monument and designated it a unit of the National Park Service. It is jointly managed with the nearby El Morro National Monument.

Protection and management

The U.S. National Park Service protects, manages, and interprets El Malpais National Monument. El Malpais Visitor Center (formerly The Northwest New Mexico Visitor Center) is just south of Exit 85 off I-40 in Grants, New Mexico.

The adjacent El Malpais National Conservation Area is protected and managed by the U.S. Bureau of Land Management. They staff the El Malpais National Conservation Area Ranger Station 8 miles down State Highway 117 south of I-40 Exit 89.

The Cibola National Forest conserves large natural areas, wildlife, and habitats in the surrounding region as well.

In literature
The second portion of the 1932 book Brave New World by Aldous Huxley takes place on the "savage reservation", which is located on land encompassing the park's area.

The malpais is the setting for a western story, "Flint" (November, 1960) by Louis L'Amour.  Flint is a successful business man who thinks he is dying of cancer and returns to a hidden campsite within the malpais he had learned of in his youth.

A scene in Cormac McCarthy's 1985 novel Blood Meridian takes place on the malpais.

See also
 List of national monuments of the United States

References

Further reading

External links

 BLM: El Malpais National Conservation Area website
 Offbeat New Mexico – El Malpais
 TopoQuest USGS Quad Map

Malpaíses (landform)
National Park Service National Monuments in New Mexico
Caves of New Mexico
Lava tubes
Natural arches of New Mexico
Volcanic fields of New Mexico
Protected areas established in 1987
Archaeological sites in New Mexico
Pre-Columbian cultural areas
Great Divide of North America
Protected areas of Cibola County, New Mexico
Landforms of Cibola County, New Mexico
1987 establishments in New Mexico
Lava fields
Badlands of the United States